Mohammadieh railway station (Persian:ايستگاه راه آهن محمدیه, Istgah-e Rah Ahan-e Mohammadieh) is located in Qom, Qom Province. The station is owned by IRI Railway. In order to shorten travel time on passing longer distance trains, most services serving Qom railway station in the city centre were moved to this station located on Qom bypass rail line.

Service summary
Note: Classifications are unofficial and only to best reflect the type of service offered on each path
Meaning of Classifications:
Local Service: Services originating from a major city, and running outwards, with stops at all stations
Regional Service: Services connecting two major centres, with stops at almost all stations
InterRegio Service: Services connecting two major centres, with stops at major and some minor stations
InterRegio-Express Service:Services connecting two major centres, with stops at major stations
InterCity Service: Services connecting two (or more) major centres, with no stops in between, with the sole purpose of connecting said centres.

References

External links

Railway stations in Iran